Wendell P. Bowman (October 31, 1847  April 8, 1928) was a major general in the Pennsylvania National Guard, and served as commander of the 28th Infantry Division.

Early life
Wendell Phillips Bowman was born in Byberry, Pennsylvania on October 31, 1847. He lived at his family's home, "Cream Ridge," and was educated at the Benjamin Rush School and the Byberry Friends' School.

American Civil War
He was still a boy when the American Civil War broke out in 1861, and was too young for military service, so he became a drummer for a militia unit, the Byberry Guards.

At age 15 he joined the 44th Pennsylvania Militia, which was later mustered into federal service as a unit of the Pennsylvania Reserves.  He was a participant in the 1863 Battle of Gettysburg, and was discharged later in 1863.

In July, 1864 Bowman joined the 197th Pennsylvania Infantry, and he served until November.

He then joined an Iowa regiment, in which he served until being discharged for ill health.  Bowman was unable to walk as a result of his illness and complications caused by the harsh conditions of his service, and used crutches until he was able to begin walking unaided again in 1874.

Post–Civil War
After the war Bowman studied law in the firm of George H. Earle, Sr. and Richard P. White (brother and husband of Caroline Earle White), attained admission to the bar, and practiced in Philadelphia.

Bowman was active in the Grand Army of the Republic, and served as Judge Advocate of the Department of Pennsylvania.  He was also a sought after speech maker, and gave orations for Pennsylvania's Republican Party, Decoration Day commemorations, and other celebrations.

On April 18, 1876 Bowman married Elizabeth (Lizzie) W. Malcolm (died October 26, 1929), the daughter of Baptist clergyman Thomas Shields Malcolm.

Continued military service
In 1877 Bowman joined the 20th Pennsylvania Regiment, which was organized to respond to labor unrest during the Great Railroad Strike of 1877.

In 1878 he received a commission as a captain in command of Company H, 1st Regiment, Pennsylvania National Guard. He advanced through the ranks and became regimental commander with the rank of colonel in 1887.

Spanish–American War
Bowman volunteered for the Spanish–American War and his regiment was mustered into federal service in 1898. He was seriously injured during training at Mount Gretna on May 2, 1898, and was unable to lead the regiment when it departed Pennsylvania, so command passed to his lieutenant colonel, J. Lewis Good.

The war ended before the 1st Pennsylvania departed for Cuba. Bowman resumed command after the regiment returned to Pennsylvania from its encampment in Tennessee.

Post-Spanish–American War
In 1907 Bowman became commander of Pennsylvania's 1st Brigade as a brigadier general.

In 1909 he became commander of the Pennsylvania National Guard Division, the organization later known as the 28th Infantry Division, and was promoted to major general. He served until retiring in 1910, and was succeeded by Charles B. Dougherty.

Death and burial
Bowman died at his home "The Elms" in Merion Station, Pennsylvania on April 8, 1928, and was buried at Merion Friends Burial Ground.

References

External links
 
 Wendell Phillips Bowman at Memorial History of the City of Philadelphia
 Wendell Phillips Bowman at Warwick's Keystone Commonwealth
 Wendell Phillips Bowman in Pennsylvania and its Public Men
 Former Head of Penna. National Guard is Dead in Harrisburg Evening News, April 9, 1928

1847 births
1928 deaths
Lawyers from Philadelphia
People from Lower Merion Township, Pennsylvania
People of Pennsylvania in the American Civil War
Union Army soldiers
American military personnel of the Spanish–American War
Pennsylvania Republicans
National Guard (United States) generals
Burials in Pennsylvania
19th-century American lawyers
Grand Army of the Republic officials